Thorn Abbey or the Imperial Abbey of Thorn was an imperial abbey of the Holy Roman Empire in what is now the Netherlands.  The capital was Thorn.  It was founded in the 10th century and remained independent until 1794, when it was occupied by French troops.  The self-ruling abbey enjoyed imperial immediacy and belonged to the Lower Rhenish-Westphalian Circle.

At the time Thorn Abbey was invaded by the French revolutionaries in 1794, its territory was composed of three non-contiguous parts totaling 52.1 km². In addition, the abbess shared condominium rule over nearby areas totaling 35 km². The abbey's territory was divided into four "quarters", each administered by two mayors. The population in 1796 was 2,975 inhabitants.

In 1797, the abbey was officially dissolved by the French. The abbey property, the monastery, the palace of the abbess and the other buildings were confiscated and sold to the highest bidders and usually demolished for construction material, with only the abbey church surviving. In 1860, the heavily damaged church was restored. The Baroque interior survived the restoration but the spire was replaced with a massive neo-Gothic bell tower.

Foundation 

Details of the founding of the abbey are not clear.  According to some sources, the abbey was founded by Countess Hilswind in 902 for herself and her daughter Beatrix.  She donated the necessary land, which had been personal property, given to the Countess by King Zwentibold.  Other sources claim a Benedictine double monastery was founded by Bishop Ansfried of Utrecht and his wife Hereswint in 925.  A Romanesque abbey church was built in 992; some sources give this as the year the abbey was founded.

Abbey structure 

The community of women came only from the high nobility.  It is likely that Thorn had belonged to the Benedictine order originally.  It probably changed, however, in the 12th century, to a free community of secular canonesses (Damenstift).  In 1310, the members of the abbey stressed their secular status and claimed never to have been Benedictine.

In the 18th century, the collegiate ladies, or canonesses, were, in principle, required to reside in the abbey all year, except for at most six weeks per year. However, for 600 florins, ladies could buy themselves freedom; although in theory they were still required to provide six weeks of choral service, this was not always observed in practice. This possibility of buying freedom appears to have been used frequently. Some ladies belonged to several abbeys.  Maria Josepha of Hatzfeld and Gleichen, for example, was a member of the abbeys at Thorn and Essen for 46 years.  During this time, she resided in Essen Abbey for four years, but never in Thorn.

The abbey district contained a curia building for the deaconess and five houses for the ladies; some built themselves houses outside the abbey precincts. In the 14th century, a new Gothic church was built.

History 
The imperial immediacy of the abbey was confirmed in 1292 by King Adolf of Nassau.  Under Emperor Maximilian I, the abbey was under the special imperial protection.  In the imperial matriculation register at Worms, the abbey was recorded as reichsunmittelbar.  The matriculation duties, however, were transferred to the Counts of Lippe.

The abbey was a member the Lower Rhenish-Westphalian Circle and the Rhenish College of Imperial Prelates.

In the 17th century the governorship of the Spanish Netherlands sought to restrict the imperial immediacy.  The abbesses resisted these attempts successfully. In the 18th century, the abbess held the title of Princess. Several abbesses were concurrently heads of Essen Abbey.

The territory was occupied by French troops in 1794 and later annexed by France. In 1815, the Congress of Vienna awarded the territory to the Kingdom of the United Netherlands.

Abbesses 
 982–?: Hilsondis (or Hilswinde?)
 1010–?: Benedicta
 ?–?: Godchildis
 ?–?: Adelaide
 Before 1217: Elizabeth
 1217–?: Jutta
 1231–1269: Hildegond de Born
 1273–1304: Guda von Rennenberg
 1310–1337: Margaret of Bautersheim I.
 1337: Isonde of Wied
 1337–1378: Margaret II of Heinsberg
 1389–1397: Margaretha III of Horne Perwez
 1404–1446: Mechtilde of Horne
 1446-1454: Jacoba of Loon-Heinsberg
 1454–1473: Else of Buren
 1473–1486: Gertrude de Sombreffe
 1486–1531: Eva of Isenburg
 Disputed claim during this period
 1531–1577: Margaretha IV of Brederode
 1577–1579: Josina I of Manderscheid
 1579–1604: Josina II of the Mark
 1604–1631: Anna of the Mark
 1631–1632: Josina Walburgis of Löwenstein-Rochefort
 1632–1646: Anna Eleonora of Staufen (simultaneously also Abbess of Essen)
 1646–1647: Anna Catherina of Salm-Reifferscheid
 1647–1690: Anna Salome of Manderscheid-Blankenheim (from 1690 to 1691 she was abbess of Essen)
 1690–1706: Eleanor of Löwenstein-Rochefort
 1706–1717: Anna Juliana of Manderscheid-Blankenstein
 1717–1776: Countess Palatine Francisca Christina of Sulzbach (she was also Abbess of Essen)
 1776–1795: Maria Kunigunde of Saxony (she was also Abbess of Essen)

References

Further reading
 Berkvens, Louis (2015): Staatkundige en institutionele geschiedenis van de Limburgse territoria, 1548-1797. In: P. Tummers et al. (eds.): Limburg. Een geschiedenis, deel 2, 1500-1800, pp. 19-115. LGOG, Maastricht 
 Bijsterveld, A.J. (2015): Machts- en territoriumvorming: van Karolingsche kernregio tot territiriale lappendeken, 900-1200. In: P. Tummers et al. (eds.): Limburg. Een geschiedenis, deel 1, tot 1500, pp. 207-240. LGOG, Maastricht 
 Crusius, Irene (ed.): Studien zum Kanonissenstift, Göttingen, 2014
 Flament, A.J. (1899): Opgezworen kwartierstaten van 36 kanonikessen der vorstelijke rijksabdij Thorn, met den inhoud der opzweringen en de beschrijving der zegels van de opzweerders. 's Gravenhage, Algemene Landsdrukkerij
 Forschelen, J. (ed.): De Abdijkerk, tourist brochure in the series Grote monumenten in Thorn. Publ. Stichting Limburg Natuurlijk (n.d.)
 Köbler, Gehrard (1988): Historisches Lexikon der Deutschen Länder: die deutschen Territorien vom Mittelalter bis zur Gegenwart: Thorn (Abtei, Frauenstift), pp. 166-167 and 852. C.H. Beck, München
 Koch, E.M.F. (1994): De kloosterpoort als sluitpost? Adellijke vrouwen langs Maas en Rij'n tussen huwelijk en convent, 1200-1600. Eisma, Leeuwarden/Mechelen
 Taddey, Gerhard (1983): Reichsstift Thorn in: Ders (ed.): Lexikon der deutschen Geschichte. Ereignisse – Institutionen – Personen. Von den Anfängen bis zur Kapitulation 1945. Kröner-Verlag, Stuttgart

External links 
 List of Abbesses

Former Christian monasteries in the Netherlands
Monasteries dissolved during the French Revolution
Christian monasteries in Limburg (Netherlands)
Former polities in the Netherlands
Lower Rhenish-Westphalian Circle
Maasgouw
History of Limburg (Netherlands)
Southern Netherlands